Goya simulata is a species of snout moth in the genus Goya. It was described by Jay C. Shaffer in 1989 and is known from Brazil.

References

External links
Review of Goya Ragonot and description of a new species, G. simulata from Paraná, Brazil (Lepidoptera: Pyralidae: Peoriinae)

Moths described in 1989
Anerastiini
Moths of South America